Lobendoceras is  a proterocameraceratid with a rather large, moderately expanded, straight shell with a large marginal siphuncle in which sutures have a broad, deep, ventral lobe and septal necks are subholochoanitic to holochoanitic.

Lobendoceras has been found in Lower Ordovician marine strata in NW Australia and Siberia.

See also
List of nautiloids

References
 Curt Teichert, 1964.  Endoceratoidea. Treatise on Invertebrate Paleontology, Part K. Geol Soc. of America and Univ of Kansas press. Teichert and Moore (eds)
 Teichert and Glenister 1954 . Early Ordovician cephalopod fauna from northwestern Australia. Bulletins of American Paleontology 35 (150): 7–112.

Prehistoric nautiloid genera
Fossils of Russia
Nautiloids
Ordovician cephalopods
Prehistoric invertebrates of Australia